The Polish energy sector is the sixth largest in Europe. The scale of energy consumption in 1996–2015 increased from 139,593 GWh to 161,438 GWh. According to the data of Polskie Sieci Elektroenergetyczne (PSE), electricity production in October 2020 amounted to 13,553 GWh; domestic consumption amounted to 14,798 GWh.

The Polish energy mix is dominated by hard coal – approx. 48% and lignite – 24%. When it comes to green energy, wind installations had the highest contribution of 9%. Other RES played a minor role, only 1%, but they are the ones that show the greatest growth dynamics.

During the April 2022 Russia–European Union gas dispute, Russia cut off natural gas deliveries to Poland after demanding to be paid in Russian rubles during currency disruptions caused by the 2022 Russian invasion of Ukraine.

Poland's 2040 energy plan
PEP2040 is a government plan for the Polish fuel and energy sector, which aims for 50% zero-emissions by 2040. It envisions building offshore wind farms and commissioning a nuclear power plant. The draft was presented in September 2020, aiming to tackle climate change, energy security, and a just transition. Poland considers 6—9 GW of nuclear power. Some energy analysts said at the end of 2021 that "a credible coal phase-out discussion on a national level in Poland has yet to start".

Overview

Coal

In 2009 Poland produced 78 megatonnes (Mt) of hard coal and 57 Mt of brown coal. As of 2020, extraction is becoming increasingly difficult and expensive, and has become uncompetitive so reliant on government subsidies. In September 2020, the government and mining unions agreed a plan to phase out coal by 2049 which coincides with 100th anniversary of Karol Wojtyła being assigned to st. Florian's parish in Kraków.

Coal and the environment
Coal mining has far-reaching effects on local water resources. Coal mining requires large amounts of water. Mining activities have dropped the water level of Lake Ostrowskie by almost two meters in the Kuyavia–Pomerania and the lakes in the Powidz Landscape Park. According to Poznań's University of Agriculture, the water drainage in the Kleczew brown coal mining areas has formed craters in the area.  Statistics from Eurostat shows that Poland accounts for 30% of the European Union's annual consumption of coal.

Coal and the public

In April 2008, five thousand people demonstrated in Kruszwica to protect cultural heritage and the nature reserve at Lake Gopło. This was the first protest of its kind in the country's history. Gopło Millennium Park (Nadgoplański Park Tysiąclecia) is protected by the European Union's Natura 2000 program and includes a major bird sanctuary. The Tomisławice opencast mine (less than 10 kilometers away from the Kruszwica mine) was due to open in 2009.

Coal and business
The Bełchatów Power Station in the Łódź region supplies almost 20% of Poland's energy. It is the largest brown coal power plant in Europe.

Electricity 

In 2018 48% of electricity produced in Poland came from hard coal, 29% from brown coal, 13% from renewable sources (mostly wind power) and 7% from natural gas. In parts of 2020, electricity costs in Poland were the highest in Europe.

Renewable energy

A binding European Union resolution, the Renewable Energy Directive 2009, stipulates a 15% renewable energy target for total energy use in Poland by  2020. According to the Polish National Renewable Energy Action Plan, the 2020 figure is set to exceed this target by 0.5% at 15.5% of overall energy use, broken down as 19.1% of total electricity consumption, 17% in the heating and cooling sector, and 10.1% in the transport sector.

As of 2014–2015 renewable energy provided around 10% of total primary energy supply in Poland as well as around 13% of total electricity generation.

Progress towards targets 

As of year end 2014 Poland had achieved an 11.45% share of renewable energy use as a percentage of overall energy usage. The overall 2014 share breaks down as 13.95% of the heating and cooling sector, 12.40% of the electricity sector and 5.67% of the transport sector.

Sources

Biomass and waste 
As of 2015 Biomass and waste was the largest source of renewable energy in Poland providing an estimated 8.9% of total primary energy supply (TPES) in that year and an estimated 6.1% of electricity generation. In 2019 there were 1,142 MW installed capacity power.

Solid biomass is the most important source by volume, providing fuel for heat and power plants or consumed directly for industrial or household heat requirements. Biogasses are also used in heat and power plants as well whilst waste is mainly used as a fuel in industry. In 2014 0.7 Mtoe of biofuels were used in transport, 81% as biodiesel and 19% as biogasoline, making up 5% of the total energy consumption in the transport sector in 2014.

Wind power 

Wind power is estimated to have provided 6.6% of total electricity generation in 2015. The total wind power grid-connected capacity in Poland was 8,255.9 MW as of 31 December 2022.

The Polish NREAP plan is targeting 6,700 MW of wind power by 2020 whilst EWEA's 2009 forecast suggests a higher wind capacity of 10–12 GW is possible.

The total capacity in Poland was 6,293.9 MW as of 1 October 2020. The Polish government had plans to reach 2,000 MW in wind power capacity and a 2.3% share of wind generation in domestic energy consumption by 2010. By the end of 2010, the capacity stood at 1,107 MW. If Poland had the same wind power density as Denmark, there would have been 23 GW of wind power by the end of 2008.

Offshore Wind

In September 2020, the government announced a 130 billion zloty (£26.5 billion) plan to invest in offshore wind.

The “Offshore Wind Act” which is being prepared by the Government is expected to enter into force in 2020. The main purpose of the Act is to set the framework for a dedicated subsidy scheme for offshore wind projects. However, it also addresses other relevant issues pertaining to the development and operation of offshore projects.

According to Polish Wind Energy Association (PWEA), offshore wind farms in the Baltic Sea with an overall capacity of 5.9 GW are set to "receive support under a two-sided contract for difference between the investor and the regulator. Awarding support under this formula will be time-limited until the end of June 2021." In a second phase, contracts are planned to be awarded by auctions. The first is to take place in 2025. The PWEA said that support will be available for projects with a total capacity of 2.5 GW in each of the auctions. By 2050, Poland wants a massive 28 GW in offshore sector, which would make Poland the largest operator of offshore wind in the Baltic Sea.

On 1 July 2020 representatives of the Polish government and Polish wind energy industry signed a “Letter of Intent on cooperation for development of offshore wind power in Poland”. The letter acknowledges the role of offshore wind in meeting the European Union's Green Deal objectives while increasing the security of energy supply and reducing Poland's CO2 emissions.

In its National Energy and Climate Plan (NECP) Poland identified offshore wind as one of key technologies to meet its goals for renewable energy for 2030. Offshore wind has also been described as strategic in the draft of Poland's Energy Policy until 2040. It will help diversifying the Polish national power generation structure that today heavily depends on coal.

Hydroelectric power 

In 2014 there were 2,364 MW installed capacity of hydroelectric power as well as 1,406 MW pumped storage capacity. In 2015 hydroelectricity generated approximately 1.1% of total electricity in Poland. In 2019 there were 2,391 MW installed capacity of hydroelectric power.

Solar power 
In 2019, the Polish government launched a scheme called "Mój Prąd", which is dedicated to supporting the development of prosumer energy, and specifically supporting the segment of photovoltaic (PV) micro-installations. The budget of the program is currently PLN 1.1 billion. 
As a result, in recent years there has been a significant increase in power in this segment of the energy sector. The total solar photovoltaics (PV) grid-connected capacity in Poland was 12,189.1 MW as of 31 December 2022.

Air quality 

The PM10 general warning limit is 100 μg/m3 in Poland. Some major cities in Poland have lower limits: Katowice, Krakow, Warsaw, Wroclaw.

Global warming
On November 4, 2021, Poland signed the 'Global Coal to Clean Power Transition Statement. 

April 2022 Jacek Sasin, minister for state assets and a deputy prime minister, said that the Russia-Ukraine war made it necessary for Poland to review an earlier energy strategy which assumed the closedown of coal energy

See also 

Oil industry in Poland
Wind power in Poland
Solar power in Poland
Nuclear energy in Poland
PGNiG – Polish state-controlled oil and natural gas company
Renewable energy by country

References

External links

 European Commission National Renewable Energy Action Plans
 European Commission renewable energy Progress Reports
 European Commission National Energy Efficiency Energy Action Plans
 Report on the Polish power system (PDF 1.44 MB), February 2014 

 
Poland